The Seiyūhontō (lit. Orthodox Constitutional Friends Party) was a political party in Japan. It was active from 1924 to 1927.

History
The party was established on 29 January 1924 following a split in the Rikken Seiyūkai over Prime Minister Kiyoura Keigo forming a government largely made up of members of the House of Peers. Of the 278 Diet members of Rikken Seiyūkai, 129 remained in the party, which opposed Kiyoura and 149 left to form the Seiyūhontō, which were happy to share power. Opposition to his government led Kiyoura to call elections in May 1924, in which the Rikken Seiyūkai was reduced to 103 seats. Although the Seiyūhontō won 111, the Kenseikai emerged as the largest party, winning 151 seats; a coalition government was subsequently formed by the Kenseikai's Katō Takaaki together with Rikken Seiyūkai and the Kakushin Club.

After the Katō government fell in August 1925 following Rikken Seiyūkai pulling out of the coalition, Katō formed a new government with the Seiyūhontō. This led to a breakaway from the party by members opposed to its cooperation, who formed the Dōkōkai, reducing Seiyūhontō to 87 seats. The party joined the government of Wakatsuki Reijirō when he succeeded Katō as Prime Minister in 1926, but the coalition collapsed due to a dispute over positions in the cabinet.

In June 1927 the party merged with Kenseikei to form Rikken Minseitō.

Election results

References

Defunct political parties in Japan
Political parties established in 1924
1924 establishments in Japan
Political parties disestablished in 1927
1927 disestablishments in Japan